In gridiron football, a guard (G), otherwise known as an offensive guard (OG), is a player who lines up between the center and the tackles on the offensive line of a football team on the line of scrimmage used primarily for blocking.  Right guards (RG) is the term for the guards on the right of the offensive line, while left guards (LG) are on the left side. Guards are to the right or left of the center.

The guard's job is to protect the quarterback from the incoming linemen during pass plays, as well as creating openings (holes) for the running backs to head through. Guards are automatically considered ineligible receivers, so they cannot intentionally touch a forward pass, unless it is to recover a fumble or is first touched by a defender or eligible receiver.

Pulling guards

Aside from speed blocking, a guard may also "pull"—backing out of his initial position and running behind the other offensive linemen to sprint out in front of a running back to engage a defensive player beyond the initial width of the offensive line. This technique is used in most playbooks for outside runs (where the play-side guard pulls as a lead blocker) and on counter plays (where the far-side guard pulls to block a play-side lineman). Vanderbilt's Dan McGugin is credited with first pulling guards.

While tackles can also pull, this strategy is generally less common as they are too far away to pull to the opposite side of the formation (for counter plays) and have the responsibility of blocking the outside defender (generally the defensive end) for outside runs. Since the guard is free of responsibility for play-side outside runs and far-side counter plays, pulling is generally a unique responsibility for guards.

The Packers sweep was a signature play of the Green Bay Packers in the 1960s, as they won five NFL titles and the first two Super Bowls under head coach Vince Lombardi. The pulling guards were Fuzzy Thurston on the left and hall of famer Jerry Kramer on the right.

References

American football positions